Englerodendron nigericum is a species of tree in the family Fabaceae. It is found in Democratic Republic of the Congo and Nigeria. It is threatened by habitat loss.

References

nigericum
Trees of the Democratic Republic of the Congo
Flora of Nigeria
Vulnerable plants